An anorak is a type of coat with a hood. Anorak may also refer to:

 Anorak (album), a 2008 album by Ruth
 Anorak (slang), British slang for a railfan, or for someone with obsessive and specific interests
 Anorak in the UK, a 2008 live album by Marillion
 The Anorak, a play about the École Polytechnique massacre
 James D. Halliday, a deceased character in Ready Player One whose OASIS persona is Anorak
Anoraak, French electronic musician